The football tournament at the 1981 South Pacific Mini Games took place in December 1993.

Group stage

Group 1

Group 2

Knockout stage

Semi-finals

Third-place match

Final

References

International association football competitions hosted by Vanuatu
1993 in Vanuatuan sport